Great Ayton is a railway station on the Esk Valley Line, which runs between Middlesbrough and Whitby via Nunthorpe. It is owned by Network Rail and managed by Northern Trains.

History

This link line was initially used solely by mineral trains. Passenger trains along the route began four years later, and a station at Great Ayton was opened on 1 April 1868.

The goods yard at the station closed down in July 1965 along with many other stations on the Esk Valley line. Until the 1950s, trains used to run from the station to Stokesley, Whitby Town and  but only the latter two destinations are now served.

Next to Great Ayton station is the village garage and towing service. The station had, until 1934, a full station building complete with booking office and waiting room, this however was demolished to save costs.

Services

As of the May 2021 timetable change, the station is served by five trains per day (four on Sunday) towards Whitby, with two trains per day (Monday to Saturday) running as far as Battersby. Heading towards Middlesbrough via Nunthorpe, there are seven trains per day (four on Sunday). Most trains continue to Newcastle via Hartlepool. All services are operated by Northern Trains.

Rolling stock used: Class 156 Super Sprinter and Class 158 Express Sprinter

References

External links
 
 

Railway stations in North Yorkshire
DfT Category F2 stations
Former North Eastern Railway (UK) stations
Railway stations in Great Britain opened in 1868
Northern franchise railway stations